Xenoctenus is a genus of spiders in the family Xenoctenidae. It was first described in 1938 by Mello-Leitão. , it contains 4 species, all from Argentina.

References

Araneomorphae genera
Spiders of Argentina
Xenoctenidae